Framlingham Mere is a 13.8-hectare nature reserve in Framlingham in Suffolk. It is managed by the Suffolk Wildlife Trust.

This site has a lake and wet meadows adjoining Framlingham Castle. There are many migrating birds, and flora include marsh marigolds, ragged-robin and lady's smock.

There is access from New Road and by a footpath past the castle from Badingham Road.

References

Suffolk Wildlife Trust